The 2016–17 season was Brøndby's 36th consecutive season in the top flight of Danish football, 27th consecutive season in the Danish Superliga, and 51st year in existence as a football club. In addition to the Danish Superliga, the club also competed in the Danish Cup and the UEFA Europa League. The season was the club's first with manager Alexander Zorniger.

Club

First team coaching staff

Club administration

Players

First team

Transfers

In 

Last updated: 12 September 2016.

Source: brondby.com

Out 

Last updated: 1 September 2016.

Source: brondby.com

Competitions

Overview 
{| class="wikitable" style="text-align: center"
|-
!rowspan=2|Competition
!colspan=8|Record
|-
!
!
!
!
!
!
!
!
|-
| Danish Superliga

|-
| Danish Cup

|-
| Europa League

|-
! Total

Danish Superliga

Main round

Results summary 

Last updated: 19 March 2017.

Source: brondby.com

Results by round

Matches

Danish Cup

UEFA Europa League

First qualifying round

Second qualifying round

Third qualifying round

Play-off round

Results summary 

Last updated: 26 August 2016.

Source: UEFA Europa League

Statistics

Appearances 

Last updated: 18 September 2016.

Source: brondby.com

Top scorers 
The list is sorted by shirt number when total goals are equal.

Last updated: 2 October 2016.

Source: brondby.com

References

External links 
 

Brondby
Brøndby IF seasons
Danish football clubs 2016–17 season